Herbert Frederick Moore (11 March 1888 – 17 June 1972) was an  Australian rules footballer who played with South Melbourne in the Victorian Football League (VFL).

Notes

External links 

1888 births
1972 deaths
Australian rules footballers from Melbourne
Sydney Swans players